Han Do-ryeong (born 25 November 1976) is a South Korean modern pentathlete. He competed in the men's individual event at the 2004 Summer Olympics.

References

1976 births
Living people
South Korean male modern pentathletes
Olympic modern pentathletes of South Korea
Modern pentathletes at the 2004 Summer Olympics
Place of birth missing (living people)
Asian Games medalists in modern pentathlon
Modern pentathletes at the 2002 Asian Games
Asian Games gold medalists for South Korea
Medalists at the 2002 Asian Games